First United Methodist Church is a historic church at 701 E Goliad Ave in Crockett, Texas.

It was built in 1922 and added to the National Register in 1983.

See also

National Register of Historic Places listings in Houston County, Texas

References

United Methodist churches in Texas
Churches on the National Register of Historic Places in Texas
Churches completed in 1922
20th-century Methodist church buildings in the United States
National Register of Historic Places in Houston County, Texas